Justice Tompkins may refer to:

Arthur S. Tompkins, justice of the New York Supreme Court
Daniel D. Tompkins, associate justice of the appellate court that was then called the Supreme Court of New York and later Vice President of the United States
George Tompkins, associate justice of the Supreme Court of Missouri
Nathaniel Tompkins, associate justice of the Maine Supreme Judicial Court